Homeworld is a 1999 video game.

Homeworld or Home world may also refer to:

 Earth, the home planet of humanity
 Homeworld (novel), the 1980 first novel in the To the Stars trilogy by Harry Harrison
 Homeworld (Palladium), a 1982 role-playing game supplement for The Mechanoid Invasion
 "Homeworld (The Ladder)", a 1999 song by Yes from The Ladder
 Homeworld, a 1981 housing exhibition promoted by the Milton Keynes Development Corporation, England
 Homeworld, the homeworld of the alien Gems in the TV series Steven Universe